The 1919 Yale Bulldogs football team represented Yale University in the 1919 college football season. The Bulldogs finished with a 5–3 record under first-year head coach Albert Sharpe.  No Yale player received first-team honors on the 1919 College Football All-America Team.

Schedule

References

Yale
Yale Bulldogs football seasons
Yale Bulldogs football